Tricolore is a ballet made by New York City Ballet balletmaster Jerome Robbins, Peter Martins (subsequently City Ballet balletmaster in chief) and Jean-Pierre Bonnefoux, conceived and supervised by City Ballet co-founder and balletmaster George Balanchine, to music by Georges Auric, commissioned by the company in 1978. The premiere took place May 18 that year at the New York State Theater, Lincoln Center.

Original cast 

  

Colleen Neary
Merrill Ashley
Karin von Aroldingen

Sean Lavery
Adam Luders

Articles 

  
NY Times, Anna Kisselgoff, May 19th, 1978 
NY Times, April 20th, 1978  
Sunday NY Times, Anna Kisselgoff, May 18th, 1980 

NY Times, February 15th, 1981  
NY Times, Anna Kisselgoff, February 23rd, 1986 

Ballets by Jean-Pierre Bonnefoux
Ballets by Jerome Robbins
Ballets by Peter Martins
New York City Ballet repertory
1978 ballet premieres
Ballets by Georges Auric